Leslie Allan Murray  (17 October 1938 – 29 April 2019) was an Australian poet, anthologist, and critic. His career spanned over 40 years and he published nearly 30 volumes of poetry as well as two verse novels and collections of his prose writings.

Translations of Murray's poetry have been published in 11 languages: French, German, Italian, Catalan, Spanish, Norwegian, Danish, Swedish, Hindi, Russian, and Dutch. Murray's poetry won many awards and he is regarded as "the leading Australian poet of his generation". He was rated in 1997 by the National Trust of Australia as one of the 100 Australian Living Treasures.

Life and career
Les Murray was born in Nabiac, New South Wales and grew up in nearby Bunyah. He attended primary and early high school in Nabiac and then Taree High School. At age 18, while watching mayflies along the river, Murray decided to become a poet.

In 1957 Murray entered the University of Sydney in the Faculty of Arts and joined the Royal Australian Navy Reserve to obtain a small income. Speaking about this time to Clive James he has said: "I was as soft-headed as you could imagine. I was actually hanging on to childhood because I hadn't had much teenage. My Mum died and my father collapsed. I had to look after him. So I was off the chain at last, I was in Sydney and I didn't quite know how to do adulthood or teenage. I was being coltish and foolish and childlike. I received the least distinguished degree Sydney ever issued. I don't think anyone's ever matched it." In 1961 The Bulletin published one of Murray's poems. He developed an interest in ancient and modern languages, and eventually qualified to become a professional translator at the Australian National University (where he was employed from 1963 to 1967). During his studies he met other poets and writers such as Geoffrey Lehmann, Bob Ellis, Clive James and Lex Banning as well as future political journalists Laurie Oakes and Mungo McCallum Jr. Between times, he hitch-hiked around Australia.  Murray lived for several months at a Sydney Push household at Milsons Point, where he read Virgil's Eclogues at the suggestion of his host, Brian Jenkins.

Murray returned to undergraduate studies in the 1960s.  He converted to Roman Catholicism when he married Budapest-born fellow-student Valerie Morelli in 1962. His poetry frequently refers to Catholic themes. The couple lived in Wales and Scotland and travelled in Europe for over a year in the late 1960s. They had five children together.

In 1971, Murray resigned from his "respectable cover occupations" of translator and public servant in Canberra (1970) to write poetry full-time. The family returned to Sydney, but Murray, planning to return to his home at Bunyah, managed to buy back part of the lost family home in 1975 and to visit there intermittently until 1985 when he and his family returned to live there permanently.

Murray died on 29 April 2019 at a Taree, New South Wales nursing home at the age of 80.

Literary career
Murray had a long career in poetry and literary journalism in Australia. When he was 38 years old, his Selected Poems was published by Angus & Robertson, signifying his emergence as a leading poet.  The Murray biographer Peter Alexander has written that "all Murray’s volumes are uneven, though as Bruce Clunies Ross would remark, 'There's "less good" and "good", but it's very hard to find really inferior Murray'."

When Murray was a student at the University of Sydney he was the editor of Hermes, with Geoffrey Lehmann (1962). Murray edited the magazine Poetry Australia (1973–79). During his tenure as poetry editor for Angus & Robertson (1976–90) he was responsible for publishing the first book of poetry by Philip Hodgins. In 1991 Murray became literary editor of Quadrant. He edited several anthologies, including the Anthology of Australian Religious Poetry. First published in 1986, a second edition was published in 1991. It interprets religion loosely and includes the work of many of poets, such A. D. Hope, Judith Wright, Rosemary Dobson, Kevin Hart, Bruce Dawe, and himself. The New Oxford Book of Australian Verse was most recently re-issued in 1996.

Murray described himself, perhaps half-jokingly, as the last of the "Jindyworobaks", an Australian literary movement whose white members sought to promote indigenous Australian ideas and customs, particularly in poetry. Though not a member, he was influenced by their work, something that is frequently discussed by Murray critics and scholars in relation to his themes and sensibilities.

In 2007, Dan Chiasson wrote in The New Yorker that Murray was "now routinely mentioned among the three or four leading English-language poets".<ref>Fire Down Below Chaissen, Dan (2007) "Fire Down Below: The Poetry of Les Murray", The New Yorker]', 11 June 2007]</ref> Murray was talked of as a possible winner of the Nobel Prize in Literature.

Murray retired as literary editor of Quadrant in late 2018 for health reasons.

Poetry
Murray published around 30 volumes of poetry and is often called Australia's bush-bard. The academic David McCooey described Murray in 2002 as "a traditional poet whose work is radically original". His poetry is rich and diverse, while also exhibiting "an obvious unity and wholeness" based on "his consistent commitment to the ideals and values of what he sees as the real Australia".

While admiring Murray's linguistic skill and poetic achievement, poet John Tranter, in 1977, also expressed uneasiness about some aspects of his work. Tranter praises Murray's "good humour" and concludes that "For all my disagreements, and many of them are profound, I found the Vernacular Republic full of rich and complex poetry."

Bourke writes that:Murray's strength is the dramatization of general ideas and the description of animals, machines, or landscape. At times his immense self-confidence produces garrulity and sweeping, dismissive prescriptions. The most attractive poems show enormous powers of invention, lively play with language, and command of rhythm and idiom. In these poems Murray invariably explores social questions through a celebration of common objects from the natural world, as in "The Broad Bean Sermon", or machines, as in "Machine Portraits with Pendant Spaceman". Always concerned with a "common reader", Murray's later poetry (for example, Dog Fox Field, 1990, Translations from the Natural World, 1992) recovers "populist" conventions of newspaper verse, singsong rhyme, and doggerel.

American reviewer Albert Mobilio writes in his review of Learning Human: Selected Poems that Murray revived the traditional ballad form. He goes on to comment on Murray's conservatism and his humour: "Because his conservatism is imbued with an angular, self-mocking wit, which very nearly belies the down-home values being expressed, he catches readers up in the joke. We end up delighted by his dexterity, if a bit doubtful about the end to which it's been put."In 2003, Australian poet Peter Porter, reviewing Murray's New Collected Poems, makes a somewhat similar paradoxical assessment of Murray:"A skewer of polemic runs through his work. His brilliant manipulation of language, his ability to turn words into installations of reality, is often forced to hang on an embarrassing moral sharpness. The parts we love – the Donne-like baroque – live side by side with sentiments we don't: his increasingly automatic opposition to liberalism and intellectuality."

Themes and subjects
Twelve years after Murray's induced birth, his mother miscarried another child.  She died after the doctor failed to call an ambulance. Literary critic Lawrence Bourke writes that "Murray, linking his birth to her death, traces his poetic vocation from these traumatic events, seeing in them the relegation of the rural poor by urban élites. Dispossession, relegation, and independence become major preoccupations of his poetry". Beyond this, though, his poetry is generally seen to have a nationalistic bent. The Oxford Companion to Australian Literature writes that: The continuing themes of much of his poetry are those inherent in that traditional nationalistic identity – respect, even reverence, for the pioneers; the importance of the land and its shaping influence on the Australian character, down-to-earth, laconic ... and based on such Bush-bred qualities as egalitarianism, practicality, straight-forwardness and independence; special respect for that Australian character in action in wartime ... and a brook-no-argument preference for the rural life over the sterile and corrupting urban environment. Of his literary journalism, Bourke writes that "In a lively, frequently polemic prose style he promotes republicanism, patronage, Gaelic bardic poetry, warrior virtu, mysticism, and Aboriginal models, and attacks modernism and feminism."

Controversies
In 1972, Murray and some other Sydney activists launched the Australian Commonwealth Party, and authored its unusually idealistic campaign manifesto. During the 1970s he opposed the New Poetry or "literary modernism" which emerged in Australia at that time, and was a major contributor to what is known in Australian poetry circles as "the poetry wars". "One of his complaints against post-modernism was that it removed poetry from widespread, popular readership, leaving it the domain of a small intellectual clique". As American reviewer Albert Mobilio describes it, Murray "waged a campaign for accessibility".

In 1995, Murray became involved in the Demidenko/Darville affair.  Helen Darville, an Australian writer who had won several major literary awards for her novel The Hand That Signed the Paper, had claimed to be  the daughter of a Ukrainian immigrant, though her parents were in fact English migrants. Murray said of Darville that "She was a young girl, and her book mightn't have been the best in the world, but it was pretty damn good for a girl of her age [20 when she wrote it]. And her marketing strategy of pretending to be a Ukrainian might have been unwise, but it sure did expose the pretensions of the multicultural industry". Biographer Alexander writes that in his poem "A Deployment of Fashion", Murray linked "the attack on Darville with the wider phenomenon of attacks on those judged outcasts (from Lindy Chamberlain to Pauline Hanson) by society’s fashion police, the journalists, academics and others who form opinion (p.282).

In 1996, Murray became involved in a controversy about whether Australian historian Manning Clark had received and regularly worn the medal of the Order of Lenin (p 276).

Adaptations
In 2005, The Widower, a short film based on five poems by Murray, was released. It was directed by Kevin Lucas and written by singer-festival director, Lyndon Terracini, with music by Elena Kats-Chernin. Its cast included Chris Haywood and Frances Rings. The five poems used for the film are "Evening Alone at Bunyah",  "Noonday Axeman", "The Widower in the Country", "Cowyard Gates" and "The Last Hellos". Sydney Morning Herald reviewer Paul Byrnes concludes his review with:
The film is stunningly beautiful at times, and wildly ambitious, an attempt to be both wordless and wordy, to get to the hypnotic state that poetry and music can induce while saying something meaningful about black and white attitudes to land and love. This last part, as I read Murray, is largely imposed and disruptive, trying to pin a romantic political agenda to the work that's hardly there. It makes the film too literal, too current, when it wants to lodge itself in the more mysterious part of the brain. The film still has a power – Haywood's performance is magnificent – but it never achieves a strong inner reality. It falls short of its own tall ambitions.

Awards and nominations
  1984 – Kenneth Slessor Prize for Poetry for The People's Other World  1989 – Creative Arts Fellowship
  1989 – Officer of the Order of Australia for services to Australian literature
  1990 – Grace Leven Prize for Poetry for Dog Fox Field  1993 – Kenneth Slessor Prize for Poetry for Translations from the Natural World  1995 – Petrarca-Preis (Petrarch Prize)
  1996 – T. S. Eliot Prize for Subhuman Redneck Poems  1997 – Rated by the National Trust of Australia as one of the 100 Australian Living Treasures.
  1998 – Queen's Gold Medal for Poetry
  2001 – shortlisted for the International Griffin Poetry Prize for Learning Human  2002 – shortlisted for the International Griffin Poetry Prize for Conscious & Verbal  2005 – Premio Mondello, Italy for Fredy NeptuneWorks

Poetry collections
 1965: The Ilex Tree (with Geoffrey Lehmann), Canberra, ANU Press
 1969: The Weatherboard Cathedral, Sydney, Angus & Robertson
 1972: Poems Against Economics, Angus & Robertson
 1974: Lunch and Counter Lunch, Angus & Robertson
 1976: Selected Poems: The Vernacular Republic, Angus & Robertson
 1977: Ethnic Radio, Angus & Robertson
 1982: Equanimities 1982: The Vernacular Republic: Poems 1961–1981, Angus & Robertson; Edinburgh, Canongate; New York, Persea Books, 1982 and (enlarged and revised edition) Angus & Robertson, 1988
 1983: Flowering Eucalypt in Autumn 1983: The People's Otherworld, Angus & Robertson
 1986: Selected Poems, Carcanet Press
 1987: The Daylight Moon, Angus & Robertson, 1987; Carcanet Press 1988 and Persea Books, 1988
 1994: Collected Poems, Port Melbourne, William Heinemann Australia
 1989: The Idyll Wheel 1990: Dog Fox Field Sydney: Angus & Robertson, 1990; Carcanet Press, 1991 and New York, Farrar, Straus and Giroux, 1993
 1991: Collected Poems, Angus & Robertson, 1991; Carcanet Press, 1991; London, Minerva, 1992 and (released as The Rabbiter's Bounty, Collected Poems), Farrar, Straus and Giroux, 1991
 1992: Translations from the Natural World, Paddington: Isabella Press, 1992; Carcanet Press, 1993 and Farrar, Straus and Giroux, 1994
 1994: Collected Poems, Port Melbourne, William Heinemann Australia
 1996: Late Summer Fires 1996: Selected Poems, Carcanet Press
 1996: Subhuman Redneck Poems 1997: Killing the Black Dog, Black Inc Publishing
 1999: New Selected Poems, Duffy & Snellgrove
 1999: Conscious and Verbal, Duffy & Snellgrove
 2000: An Absolutely Ordinary Rainbow 2001: Learning Human: New Selected Poems (Poetry pleiade), Farrar, Straus and Giroux, Carcanet
 2002: Poems the Size of Photographs, Duffy & Snellgrove and Carcanet Press
 2002: New Collected Poems, Duffy & Snellgrove; Carcanet Press, 2003
 2006: The Biplane Houses, Carcanet Press. Farrar, Straus and Giroux, 2008
 2010: Taller When Prone, Black Inc Publishing
 2011: Killing the Black Dog: A Memoir of Depression, Farrar, Straus and Giroux, 86 pp (autobiographical)
 2012: The Best 100 Poems of Les Murray, Black Inc Publishing
 2014: New Selected Poems, Farrar, Straus and Giroux
 2015: Waiting for the Past, Carcanet
 2015: The Tin Wash Dish, The Chinese University of Hong Kong Press
2015: On Bunyah, Black Inc Publishing
2018: Collected Poems, Black Inc Publishing
2022: Continuous Creation: Last Poems, Farrar, Straus and Giroux

Collections as editor
 1986: Anthology of Australian Religious Poetry (editor), Melbourne, Collins Dove, 1986 (new edition, 1991)
 1991: The New Oxford Book of Australian Verse, Melbourne,Oxford University Press, 1986 and Oxford, Oxford University Press, 1991, 1999
 1994: Fivefathers, Five Australian Poets of the Pre-Academic Era, Carcanet Press
 2005: Hell and After, Four early English-language poets of Australia Carcanet
 2005: Best Australian Poems 2004, Melbourne, Black Inc.
 2012: The Quadrant Book of Poetry 2001–2010, Sydney, Quadrant Books

Verse novels
 1979: The Boys Who Stole the Funeral, Angus & Robertson, 1979, 1980 and Manchester, Carcanet, 1989
 1999: Fredy Neptune, Carcanet and Duffy & Snellgrove

Prose collections 
 1978: The Peasant Mandarin, St. Lucia, UQP
 1984: Persistence in Folly: Selected Prose Writings, Angus & Robertson
 1984: The Australian Year: The Chronicle of our Seasons and Celebrations, Angus & Robertson
 1990: Blocks and Tackles, Angus & Robertson
 1992: The Paperbark Tree: Selected Prose, Carcanet; Minerva, 1993
 1999: The Quality of Sprawl: Thoughts about Australia, Duffy & Snellgrove
 2000: A Working Forest, essays, Duffy & Snellgrove
 2002: The Full Dress, An Encounter with the National Gallery of Australia'', National Gallery of Australia

See also

List of Australian poets

Notes

External links 

Profile at the Poetry Archive, with poems written and audio. 
Profile of Murray with poems and audio at Poets.org. Retrieved 2011-01-03
Profile and poems at the Poetry Foundation. Retrieved 2011-01-03 
Griffin Poetry Prize biography, poem and audio files.  Murray poems written and audio. Retrieved 2011-01-03
New Les Murray poems (April 2013) in Qualm
"A life in writing: Les Murray" Guardian profile 20 November 2010. Retrieved 2011-01-03 
Les Murray profile at Macmillan (US publishers). Retrieved 2011-01-03 

Five videos of Murray reading poems  on SlowTV (Australia). Retrieved 2011-01-03

1938 births
2019 deaths
ALS Gold Medal winners
Anthologists
Australian male poets
Australian poets
Australian Roman Catholics
Converts to Roman Catholicism
Critics of multiculturalism
Critics of postmodernism
Formalist poets
Granta people
People from Taree
Officers of the Order of Australia
Quadrant (magazine) people
Roman Catholic writers
University of Sydney alumni
T. S. Eliot Prize winners